Tragiscoschema amabile is a species of beetle in the family Cerambycidae. It was described by Perroud in 1855, originally as "Tragocephala amabilis".

References

Tragocephalini
Beetles described in 1855